William Garlow (January 1, 1888 – April 14, 1959) was a minor league baseball player and American football player and coach. He served as the head football coach at West Virginia Wesleyan College in Buckhannon, West Virginia during the 1915 season. Prior to that, he was an athlete at the Carlisle Indian School in Carlisle, Pennsylvania where he was teammates with future National Football League star Jim Thorpe.

References

External links

 

1888 births
1959 deaths
Baseball pitchers
Canton Bulldogs players
Carlisle Indians football players
Hamilton Kolts players
Jackson Convicts players
Lewiston Cupids players
West Virginia Wesleyan Bobcats football coaches